Lycapsus is a genus of flowering plants in the tribe Perityleae within the family Asteraceae.

Species
There is only one known species, Lycapsus tenuifolius, native to Chile in South America.

References

Endemic flora of Chile
Perityleae
Monotypic Asteraceae genera